Brigitte Kowanz (13 April 1957 – 28 January 2022) was an Austrian artist. Kowanz studied from 1975 to 1980 at the University of Applied Arts Vienna. She was Professor of Transmedial Art there from 1997.

Works 
Since the 1980s, Brigitte Kowanz's work focused on the investigation of space and light. At the beginning of this period, between 1979 and 1984, she produced paper and screen images with phosphorescent and fluorescent pigments in collaboration with Franz Graf. From 1984, Kowanz developed her first light objects from bottles, fluorescent lamps and fluorescent paint. Complex spatial images and light-shadow-projections were created using the simplest of means.

However, light is not only a material, but also often a topic of Kowanz's works. For example, she was engaged with the speed of light in a personal complex of works since 1989. A very small decimal number in neon figures indicates the time that the light needs to cover the length of this sequence of numbers.

One complex issue that Kowanz was engaged in since the 1980s is that of language and writing and its translation into codes. Light was investigated as a space-forming medium as well as an information carrier and medium of knowledge and visibility.

From 1995, Kowanz also regularly used the morse alphabet – based on simple dash-dot combinations – for coding purposes. As a binary code, it represents the origin of the transfer of information using light. Kowanz used (semi-)transparent glasses and mirrors, especially in her later works. This led to a diverse overlaying of the virtual and the real in her three-dimensional objects. The mutual reflection of light, language and mirror (Rainer Fuchs) produces hybrid spaces whose boundaries seem to be clearly defined at one moment, but gone again the next. Real space and virtual reflection penetrate each other, the boundaries between artwork and observer became fluid.

The occupation with the intangible physics of light, which – although a guarantee of visibility – is itself slightly overlooked, persists in the works of Brigitte Kowanz.

Personal life 
Kowanz lived and worked in Vienna. She died on 28 January 2022, at the age of 64.

Brigitte Kowanz was the daughter of the well-known footballer Karl Kowanz (1926-1998), her mother Edith worked as a clerk, her older brother Karl (* 1951) became a graphic artist. Brigitte Kowanz graduated from the Kunstgymnasium Wien in 1975, then studied - like her brother before her - at the Hochschule für angewandte Kunst, graduating in 1980 with a Magister Artium.

Brigitte Kowanz's son, Adrian Kowanz (*1995), a trained art historian and close collaborator for many years, has been managing her estate ever since.

Awards 
 1989 Otto Mauer Prize
 1991 Prize of the City of Vienna for Visual Arts
 1996 Austrian Art Prize for Visual Arts
 2009 Grand Austrian State Prize for Visual Arts
 2018 German Light Art Award
2019 Cairo Biennale Prize

Exhibitions (selection) 
 2020 Brigitte Kowanz - Lost under the Surface, Museum Haus Konstruktiv, Zurich
 2019 Cairo Biennale, Cairo
2017 La Biennale di Venezia, Austrian Pavillon, Venice
 2013 Bryce Wolkowitz Gallery, New York
 2013 Lightshow, Hayward Gallery, Southbank Centre, London
 2012 Borusan | Contemporary, Istanbul (solo exhibition)
 2012 MACRO, Museo d'Arte Contemporanea, Rome
 2011 Galerie im Taxispalais, Innsbruck (solo exhibition)
 2010 MUMOK, Museum Moderner Kunst, Vienna (solo exhibition)
 2007 Kunsthalle Krems (solo exhibition)
 2006 Lichtkunst aus Kunstlicht, ZKM, Karlsruhe
 2004 Stadtlicht – Lichtkunst, Lehmbruck-Museum, Duisburg
 2001 Austrian Contemporary Art Exhibition, Shanghai Art Museum
 2000 Farbe zu Licht, Fondation Beyeler, Basel
 1995 Neuer Berliner Kunstverein (NBK), Berlin
 1993 Wiener Secession (solo exhibition)
 1990 Biennale of Sydney
 1989 Prospect, Frankfurter Kunstverein
 1987 São Paulo Art Biennial
 1984 Aperto, Venice Biennale

Art in public space (selection) 

 2020 Light Circles, MQ-Libelle in Vienna's Museumsquartier
 2010/2012 Max Planck Institute for Chemistry, Mainz
 2010/2011 Staatsbrücke bridge, Salzburg
 2009/2010 Volksbank AG, Vienna
 2007–2008 Museum Liaunig, Neuhaus
 2006–2007 Max Planck Institute for Molecular Biomedicine, Münster
 2003/2005 DKV, Cologne
 2003/2004 Regional Music School, Windischgarsten
 2001/2004 Jacob Burckhardt House, Basel
 2002/2004 LGT Liechtenstein, Vaduz
 2001 BUWOG, Vienna
 1999/2000 ARD Capital Studio, Berlin
 1999 Lünerseepark, Bürs
 1995/99 Peter Merian House, Bahnhof Ost railway station, Basel

Works in museums and public collections (selection)

Austria 
 Albertina, Vienna
 Lentos Art Museum, Linz
 mumok – museum of modern art ludwig foundation vienna
 State Museum of Lower Austria, St. Pölten
 Essl Collection, Klosterneuburg
 Museum of Applied Arts, Vienna
 Österreichische Galerie Belvedere, Vienna
 Tyrolean State Museum, Innsbruck

International 
 Centre for International Light Art (Unna)
 Museion (Bolzano) 
 Museum Ritter (Waldenbuch) 
 Museo de Bellas Artes (Caracas) 
 Kunstmuseum Celle  
 Fundación ARCO (Madrid)  
 Borusan Art Collection (Istanbul) 
 Kunsthalle Weishaupt (Ulm) 
 Schauwerk Sindelfingen

Bibliography (selected) 
 Beate Ermacora; Gregor Jansen: Brigitte Kowanz – in light of light. Nuremberg: Verlag für moderne Kunst 2012. 
 Museum Ritter, Waldenbuch (publ.): Brigitte Kowanz: Think outside the box. Heidelberg: Verlag Das Wunderhorn 2011.  
 Museum Moderner Kunst Stiftung Ludwig Wien (publ.): Brigitte Kowanz. Now I See. Nuremberg: Verlag für moderne Kunst 2010. 
 Agnes Husslein-Arco, Gerald Bast (publ.): Brigitte Kowanz: ad infinitum. Vienna: Belvedere 2008. 
 Galleria Contemporaneo, Mestre (publ.): Brigitte Kowanz. Dario De Bastiani Editore 2007. 
 University of Applied Arts, Vienna (publ.): more L978T. Vienna 2006.  
 Wolfgang Häusler (publ.): Another time another place, Brigitte Kowanz. Munich 2002. 
 Wolfgang Häusler (publ.): Zeitlicht-Lichtraum, Brigitte Kowanz. Ostfildern-Ruit: Hatje-Cantz 2001. 
 University of Applied Arts, Vienna (publ.): Brigitte Kowanz. Die Zwischenzeit vom Schattensprung belichten, Vienna 1998. 
 Licht ist was man sieht. Brigitte Kowanz. Vienna: Triton Verlag 1997. 
 Wiener Secession (publ.), Brigitte Kowanz. Vienna 1993.

External links 
 Website of the artist 
 Galerie Nikolaus Ruzicska, Salzburg
 Häusler Contemporary, Munich and Zurich
 Bryce Wolkowitz Gallery, New York

References

1957 births
2022 deaths
Austrian artists
University of Applied Arts Vienna alumni
Artists from Vienna